Pierre Culot (12 January 1938 – 9 March 2011 in ) was a Belgian sculptor and ceramicist.

Biography

Education
Born into a family of teachers, Pierre Culot grew up in Namur. From his adolescence, he was attracted to the world of art and antiquity. In 1954, he joined the School of Artistic Crafts at Maredsous Abbey, where he studied ceramic art under Richard Owczarek. At weekends, he would visit the workshop of painter Yvonne Perin (1905–1967) in Namur, where he mixed with other artists and intellectuals. He left the school in Maredsous in 1957. He then went to study as an apprentice with Belgian ceramicist Antoine de Vinck and perfect his technical training. During his training, he discovered the Ratilly stoneware style, introduced to him by French ceramicists Jeanne Pierlot and Norbert Pierlot. He later met Jacqueline Lerat, Yves Mohy, Pierre Digan, Elisabeth Joulia and Robert Deblander.
In 1958, he joined the La Cambre National School of Visual Arts in Brussels and attended the workshop of sculptor Charles Leplae. There, he met a whole generation of future artists, including illustrator Miche Wynants (born in 1934 in Louvain), whom he later married. He visited other artist's workshops that year, including that of Pierre Caille, and also convinced the English master potter Bernard Leach to host him at his workshop in Cornwall. His stay proved to be highly beneficial—he spent time among other apprentices and potters, some of whom went on to shape the art of ceramics in the second half of the 20th century, such as Michael Cardew or Gwyn Hanssen-Pigott.

Trips abroad 
From 1959 to 1961, Pierre Culot carried out compulsory military service. He was posted to the Congo while the country sought independence, and discovered local ceramics during his time there.
In 1963, Pierre et Miche went on their honeymoon. The couple passed through the Alps and Brindisi, and down through Italy to end up in Greece. They took also took advantage of the opportunity to visit painter and engraver Giorgio Morandi at his workshop during the trip.
Pierre Culot later travelled to various European countries as well as spending time in Japan, where he met ceramicist Shoji Hamada in 1973. Hamada was linked to the Mingei movement, which would influence all of Culot's ceramic works. He returned to Japan for a second trip in 1974. 
In 1976, he travelled to India and discovered Chandigarh, a city that is home to countless architectural creations by Le Corbusier, Pierre Jeanneret and Matthew Nowicki.
In 1988, Pierre Culot went to Yemen with a group of French architects. This trip cultivated his reflections on sculpture. The architecture in the cities of Al-Hudaydah, Sanaa and Taiz that he visited would inspire his ceramics and sculptures to take on new shapes, such as columns and walls built from brick and stoneware tiles.

Artistic life

Pierre Culot: Contemporary ceramicist 
In 1962, Pierre Culot set up a workshop on the rue du Luxembourg in Brussels. He hosted artists at his workshop, including Lison Guerry-Verdet (1938–2001). He was frequently supported by Mr et Mrs Baucher-Féron, who worked in interior design and decoration and had a studio in Avenue Louise in Brussels. Culot's ceramics were regularly displayed there up to the 1980's. A year before their wedding in 1963, Culot exhibited with Miche Wynants at the Vendôme Gallery in Brussels.
From 1963, Pierre Culot became affiliated with a variety of organisations that promoted Belgian artists and artisans: He has been featured in two successive editions of the Brabant Métiers d'Art directory.
1964 marked the start of a promising career: In Paris, Pierre Culot exhibited at the Robert Delpire Gallery. In London, his ceramics were hosted by the Primavera Gallery, which championed creations by Hans Coper, Lucie Rie, Bernard Leach and Michael Cardew at the time. In 1967, he entered the International Contemporary Ceramic Art Competition, organised by the Museum of Ceramics in Faenza, and was awarded the Ministry of Foreign Trade prize for his clay vases.

Pierre Culot: Potter 
"More important to me than any award, is that my friends think of me each morning when they drink from my bowls" Pierre Culot affirmed.
Throughout his life, as a potter, Pierre Culot worked with stoneware clay. The practice of turning pottery at the wheel was of great importance to him. It was through this practice that he made bowls, objects that constituted, for him, the fundamental and instantaneous architecture that prepared him to conquer space in sculpture: "The bowl is something of a primitive form, with its resemblance to the shape of a shell, it is the ultimate structure. Held between two hands, it presents an offering—the bowl is an extension of the hand. It is the hand that guides the eye and not the contrary."
Pierre Culot's "mixed pots" blur the boundaries between pottery and sculpture. Formed using plaques, these vases were made up of two to four different materials, creating a visible "fragmentation of volume".

Pierre Culot: Sculptor-architect, sculptor-landscaper, sculptor-ceramicist 
Pierre Culot was interested in sculpture throughout his career and became deeply dedicated to the craft as the years went by. Everything in his work relates to it, without being defined as such.
"Pierre Culot, sculptor, architect, gardener or artist?" as questioned by Maurice Culot in the monograph "Jardins-sculptures, sculptures-jardins" (éditions du Seuil, 2000). Referring to the foreword to "Jardins enchantés, un romancero" by Ferdinand Bac (1925), the answer that the author gives could not be more fitting for Pierre Culot: "By being a gardener and geometrician from time to time, I have faced blame, which I accept in all its rigor. Perhaps I saw in that a way to restore the links with methods formerly used by artisans who felt enough childlike love in their hearts to love the universe and practice as many crafts as they pleased."
 In the 1960's, Pierre Culot received several commissions for "living walls". In 1965, he produced openwork panels and stoneware tiles, demonstrating an interest in the architectural arrangement of ceramic objects. The year after, he was requested to design an openwork wall for a conference room at the Tour du Midi in Brussels. In that same year, Pierre Culot also received a request from the University of Liège to devise a wall at the Sart Tilman Open Air Museum. He carried out this œuvre, which was halfway between sculpture and architecture, in collaboration with architects Claude Strebelle and Pierre Humblet in 1967.
In 1988, inspired by his trip to Yemen, Pierre Culot began creating sculptures that he called "Architectures en terre" from a combination of stoneware and brick, held together by mortar—following a technique that he observed on his travels . These sculptures took the form of walls, pillars or steles.
From 1993, he started on a new series of works that he referred to as "steles" and "capitals". These constituted pieces of stoneware moulded with imprints of varying depths in horizontal or diagonal lines. This resulted in a pleat-like effect, evocative of the wings and the clothing of the Victoire de Samothrace statue. Culot dedicated several exhibitions to these creations, notably one at the Stedelijk museum in Amsterdam in 1995.
Pierre Culot's sculptures cannot be appreciated and understood for their true value without comprehension of their anchorage in place, their roots, and their space and elevation within an environment. His sculptures convey, to quote Claude Lorent,"an attitude towards life, that is at once humble et participative, determined and inventive, the aim of which would be to propose a long-lasting and unprecedented union between being and nature, through the intervention of art considered to be a cerebral and spiritual path and continuous trial".

Approaches to other materials (wood, brick, stone, metal) 
Throughout his life, Pierre Culot was interested in materials besides stoneware, particularly in terms of creating sculptures with wood. In 1973, one of his wood sculptures won the "Young Belgian sculptor" competition. Pierre Culot also created numerous models, made using a combination of wood, stone and clay. He discovered the work of sculptor Eduardo Chillida in 1969 during a retrospective in Zurich, which would go on to have a considerable impact on him. His interest in materials led him to devise an exhibition on recycling in 2004 at the Tournay-Solvay park in Watermael-Boitsfort, which featured sculptures made of metal, corrugated iron, wood and stone.

Interest in design: Tables, chairs and lamps 
From the 1960s, Pierre Culot developed an interest in interior design. Everyday objects and furniture appealed to him. In 1974, he built his first coffee table using Belgian Bluestone from Hainaut. He also sketched other models of tables and different furniture (designed with different types of stone and in wood). At the beginning of the 1980's, he set about making a prototype of a lamp with a triangular base made from a plaster mold, which meant it could be mass-produced. He created three molds of different heights from this one model and decided to make it available either with or without enamelling. He also designed wall lamps based on the same principle. Throughout his career, he continued to produce openwork panels, situated at the intersection of mural sculpture and design.

International recognition 

Pierre Culot received international recognition early in his career. In 1964, the National Museum of Modern Art in Tokyo acquired one of his ceramic pieces. In 1974, the Victoria and Albert Museum in London hosted his works for a solo exhibition. Three years earlier in 1971, the Stedelijk Museum in Amsterdam held a dedicated exhibition on Pierre Culot's work and repeated the event from 1994 to 1995. Throughout his career, Pierre Culot saw his work exhibited in many different galleries and museums in France, Switzerland, Luxemburg and the Netherlands, as well as outside of Europe in Turkey (1972), Canada (1973) and Thailand in (2001). Museums that have exhibited the work of Pierre Culot include, the National Ceramics Museum in Sèvres, the Museum of Design and the Bellerive Museum in Zurich, the Museum of Contemporary Design and Applied Arts in Lausanne, the Royal Museums of Art and History in Brussels and the Newark Museum in New Jersey, USA.

Later years 
In 2005, Pierre Culot was the victim of an attack. His condition left him unable to work for two years. In the workshop in Roux-Miroir, his collaborators continue their activities and sculptural projects and exhibitions go on. Pierre Culot died in Roux-Miroir on March 9, 2011.

Significant locations

Roux-Miroir

Home 
Pierre Culot and Miche Wynants married in 1963. Their daughter Charlotte Culot was born in 1964 and went on to become a painter. In 1965, Eléonore Culot, was born but unfortunately died prematurely. In 1967, their son Joseph Culot was born, who was later responsible for the revival of activities at the Roux-Miroir workshops in 2015.
From 1964, their home and workshop became a visible extension of their universe, thanks in part to the contribution of interior designer Louis Daliers to renovating the old farm.

Garden 
Surrounding the farm was originally a piece of land just waiting to become a landscape. From there emerged the Roux-Miroir garden. Over the years, plants, trees and sculptures by Pierre Culot found their place in the garden, arranged in a peaceful, natural and subtly designed composition. The garden at Roux-Miroir is a testimony to the importance of sculpture in the artistic life of Pierre Culot.

Eppe-Sauvage (1991–2007) 
As time went by, Roux-Miroir turned out to be too small for Pierre Culot's monumental oeuvres. In 1991, Pierre Culot bought a 30-hectare estate in Eppe-Sauvage in northern France. There, in the heart of Avesnes-sur-Helpe, an area known as Avesnois, he brought to life immense sculptures in brick and granite, that he called "Arches". Weighing several dozen tonnes, constructing them required impressive methods. In 1997, one of these archways was erected on the boulevard du Roi Albert II in Brussels. Others took up residence in various private gardens, largely in France and Belgium.

Collaborations and handover

Collaborations 
Throughout his career, Pierre Culot received support from artist collaborations, notably with René Bosman (1921–2015), Thiébaut Chagué (1958) et Pascal Slootmakers (1966), all of whom left their mark on his workshop. They participated in the creation and development of utilitarian ceramics made from plaster molds, allowing series to be produced indefinitely.

Collections 
During their travels and visits, Miche et Pierre Culot collected ceramics from diverse origins and time periods. On several occasions, Pierre Culot presented pieces from this collection alongside his own works. Constituting an important cultural heritage, an inventory of his collection was initiated in 2016.

Revival in 2016 
Joseph Culot relaunched activities at Roux-Miroir with the support of a long-term collaborator of Pierre Culot, Pascal Slootmakers, his own childhood friend Arnaud Van Schevensteen, and artistic director Dimitri Jeurissen. Today, the Atelier Pierre Culot has several functions, including continuing the production of certain pieces based on original models, classifying and conserving the artist's archives and collections, collaborating with brands on specific projects, as well as hosting artist residencies for emerging talents.
In 2020, Dimitri Jeurissen and Arnaud Van Schevensteen took a step back from their roles. Joseph Culot continues with the production of ceramics, lamps, tables and openwork panels—focusing on sorting the archives in order to carry out a monograph of the work of Pierre Culot, as well as spending time on putting together an inventory of his collection of ceramics.

Timeline (major exhibitions and achievements)

References

Bibliography

External links 

 Website
 Mur de pierre d'âge viséen (1967) at the Sart Tilman Open Air Museum
 Le Mur (1996) at the Sculpture garden at the Faculté de Médecine at the Catholic University of Louvain in Brussels
 Le Fruit du Mur (2000) on the website of La Commission des Arts in the region of Wallonne
 La Porte de la Connaissance (2002) on the website of the Commune of Uccle

1938 births
2011 deaths
20th-century Belgian sculptors
21st-century Belgian sculptors
Belgian ceramists